The Jujuy tuco-tuco (Ctenomys juris) is a species of rodent in the family Ctenomyidae. It is known only from one location at an elevation of 500 m in southeastern Jujuy Province of northern Argentina.

References

Mammals of Argentina
Tuco-tucos
Mammals described in 1920
Taxa named by Oldfield Thomas